Patricia Ann Farmer (27 September 1938 5 March 2004) was an English-born Canadian stage and television actress.

Biography
Patricia, the daughter of Thomas and Pauline Farmer, born in Watford, England. She immigrated to Canada in 1955 with her parents and trained at The Royal Conservatory of Music, Toronto. After becoming Miss Canada, she pursued an acting career with the Canadian Players and onto the television screen. In 1960s, Patricia married Gregory Barnes in West Vancouver and they had two children, David and Jenny. In mid-1970s, the family moved to Saltspring Island.

Death
Patricia Farmer died at Nanaimo Regional General Hospital, Vancouver Island, British Columbia, on 5 March, 2004, aged 65.

Television credits

References

External links

1938 births
2004 deaths
Farmer
English emigrants to Canada
20th-century Canadian actresses
Farmer